The Representation of the People (Ireland) Act 1832, commonly called the Irish Reform Act 1832, was an Act of Parliament that introduced wide-ranging changes to the election laws of Ireland. The act was passed at approximately the same time as the Reform Act 1832, which applied to England and Wales.

From 1 January 1801, Ireland was represented in the House of Commons by 100 members. Each of the thirty-two counties returned two MPs as did the Boroughs of Dublin City, County Dublin and Cork City, County Cork. Thirty-one other Boroughs and Dublin University sent one MP to Westminster.

The 1832 Act increased the total number of seats in Ireland was therefore increased to 105, with a second seat to the boroughs of Belfast, County Antrim; Galway Borough, County Galway; Limerick City, County Limerick and Waterford, County Waterford, as well as Dublin University.

From 1801 to 1829, the possession of freehold land worth at least 40 shillings (£2) conferred a county vote, as in England and Wales in this period. Catholics, who had been permitted to qualify as Irish voters only since 1793, were excluded from serving in Parliament until 1829. On the same day that the Roman Catholic Relief Act 1829 was enacted, allowing Catholics to sit in Parliament, a more restrictive county franchise was introduced under the Parliamentary Elections (Ireland) Act 1829, requiring possession of freehold land worth at least £10 (a fivefold increase from the previous 40 shillings), as the qualification for a county vote.

The 1832 legislation left the Irish county electorate much the same, but some new qualifications added to the electorate. From 1832 the qualifications were £10 freeholders, leaseholders for lives and copyholders of estates of £10, leaseholders for at least 60 years and the assignees of the same or leaseholders for at least 14 years of £20 estates.

Before 1832 each borough constituency had its own qualification for voting. In some, only the members of the corporation (the Borough Council) had the vote. In others, a wider group of freemen and 40 shilling freeholders could vote.

The number of borough voters before the Reform Acts varied considerably. A by-election took place in Bandon, County Cork. On 22 July 1831, the by-election was decided by only 11 voters (divided five, four and two across three candidates). A by-election was held for the two seats of Dublin City, County Dublin, on 18 August 1832. It involved 4,550 votes (each voter could cast one or two votes as they pleased). This last vote was the final pre-reformed parliamentary election in Ireland.

In 1832 the Irish boroughs were given a more uniform franchise. In addition to those who qualified under the previous rules, all occupiers of property worth at least £10 and resident freemen by birth or servitude became electors. The freemen were members of trade guilds, either because they had inherited membership or because they had served an apprenticeship to become members.

The franchise for the university had been held by the provost, fellows and scholars of Trinity College Dublin. From 1832, all University of Dublin graduates holding a Master of Arts could vote.

The introduction of electoral registration in Ireland in 1832 confirms that there continued to be considerable differences in electorates after the Reform legislation. The range in number of registered voters was as follows.

County constituencies (two seats each):
 Sligo County 695;
 Cork County 3,835

Borough constituencies:
 Lisburn, County Antrim 91 (1 seat);
 Dublin City, County Dublin 7,008 (2 seats)

The Parliamentary Boundaries (Ireland) Act 1832 was enacted on the same day, specifying the limits of the remaining borough constituencies, with slight alterations in some cases.

The Act was repealed by the Electoral Act 1963.

See also

 List of Acts of the Parliament of the United Kingdom, 1820–1839
 Reform Acts
 Representation of the People Act

References
 :
 c.88: Representation of the People (Ireland) Act 1832
 c.89: Parliamentary Boundaries (Ireland) Act 1832
 

1832 in Ireland
Acts of the Parliament of the United Kingdom concerning Ireland
History of Ireland (1801–1923)
Representation of the People Acts
United Kingdom Acts of Parliament 1832
Electoral reform in Ireland (1801–1921)